The Lujiang–Tongling railway is a single-track railway in China. It was built to transport freight, particularly coal and minerals.

History
Construction began on 23 July 2014. The railway opened to freight on 29 December 2018. Passenger services began on 18 March 2019.

Route
The line parts from the Hefei–Jiujiang railway south of Lujiang and heads east. There are two intermediate passenger stations: Longqiao and Wuwei South. The line subsequently heads south and crosses the Yangtze via the Tongling Yangtze River Road-railway Bridge, which it shares with the Hefei–Fuzhou high-speed railway. The line ends at Zhongming, where it meets the Nanjing–Tongling railway.

References

Railway lines in China
Railway lines opened in 2018